Mary Mack is a clapping game played by children.

Mary Mack may also refer to:

 Mary Mack (comedian) (born 1975), American folk humorist
 Mary Bono Mack (born 1961), American politician
 "Mary Mack" (folk song), a Scottish folk song

See also 
 "Mary Mac", a song by the Blackeyed Susans